Charlie Grant's War is a Canadian television film, directed by Martin Lavut and broadcast by CBC Television in 1985. Set during World War II, the film stars R. H. Thomson as Charlie Grant, a Canadian activist and humanitarian who was living in Austria at the time of the war, and helped to smuggle over 600 Jews out of the country for their safety.

The film's cast also included Jean Archambault, Anthony Bekenn, Peter Boretski, Douglas Campbell, Marigold Charlesworth, Peter Dvorsky, Jan Rubeš, Vlasta Vrána, Louis Negin, Joan Orenstein and John Friesen.

The film had its television premiere on January 27, 1985.

Plot
Shocked and horrified by the rising tide of anti-Semitism in war-torn Vienna, Grant uses his position as a diamond broker to obtain illegal passports and safe passage for hundreds of Jews.  He is discovered, arrested by the Gestapo, and imprisoned in some of the most notorious Nazi concentration camps in Europe.

Accolades and Awards
The film received several ACTRA Award nominations at the 15th ACTRA Awards in 1986, including for Best TV Program, Best Actor (Thomson), Best Supporting Performance (Dvorsky, Rubeš) and Best Writing (Anna Sandor). It won the awards for Best Program and Best Writing.

References

External links

1985 films
1985 television films
Canadian war drama films
English-language Canadian films
Films directed by Martin Lavut
CBC Television original films
World War II films based on actual events
Canadian films based on actual events
Canadian drama television films
Canadian World War II films
1980s Canadian films